Dada Ima (End of The Hunt) is a Sri Lankan Sinhalese drama thriller film directed by Dr. Naomal Perera and co-produced by director himself with Dr. Nishani Fernando for Ensquared Entertainment  Private Limited. It stars Swarna Mallawarachchi and Jackson Anthony in lead roles along with Mahendra Perera, Akhila Dhanuddara and Marion Wettasinghe. Music composed by Nadeeka Guruge. It is the sequel to 1985 film Dadayama by Vasantha Obeysekera.

In February 2020, the film won the Golden Fox award at Kolkata International Film Festival for the best maiden direction.

Plot
 PROLOGUE
Rathmalie's tragic story of cheat and deceit which resulted in her untimely death at the hands of her fiancé’, Priyankara, who ran over her in his car, was screened as the award-winning and Internationally acclaimed Sinhala film ‘Dadayama’  (The Hunt) in 1985 in Sri Lanka (Directed by Wasantha Obeysekara). It was based on a true story which took place many decades ago in which the accused was found guilty and sentenced to death by Supreme Court in Sri Lanka.

‘Dada Ima’ (End of the Hunt)
Dada Ima is a Sequel Drama genre movie, fictitiously based on 3 decade old ‘Dadayama’ film. After Rathmalie's demise, the custody of their one-year-old son (Ravinath) falls under her sister, Rohini. Rohini without disclosing the truth about his parents to Ravinath, lives with him in Europe after leaving the motherland in 1986. Her reluctance to return to Sri Lanka is governed by her fears and disgust of a haunting past of her sister's catastrophic death. 
Priyankara, meanwhile, has absconded the legal repercussions by concealing the murder of Rathmalie for 30 years, and was residing in the UK under a false identity. After completing his education there, he now has come back to Sri Lanka as Keerthi Gajanayaka, a well-known President's Counsel.

In the background of these past events, three decades of silence is shattered as Ravinath, who is now a renowned pianist is invited to perform at a concert in Sri Lanka. During his stay, he has a fateful encounter with Keerthi Gajanayake. Ravinath not realizing Keerthi to be his father, confronts him following a dream he sees, which is mixed with some past events of his "mother's" brutal murder. When Rohini understands that Priyankara, aka Keerthi is still alive, she decides to join her "son", with the aims of discovering the truth about her sister's murder, and to hide the malevolent past from Ravinath. ‘Dada Ima’, smoothly unfolds the secrets of the past, and depicts that no one escapes punishment after committing a crime during his lifetime.

Cast 
 Swarna Mallawarachchi
 Jackson Anthony
 Akhila Dhanuddara
 Mahendra Perera
 Marion Wethasinghe
 Daya Thennakoon
 Nayana Hettiarachchi
 Dilmin Perera
 Chandrasoma Binduhewa
 Chinthaka Vaas
 Arun Dias Bandaranayake
 Rajasinghe Loluwagoda
 Nadeeka Guruge

Awards
The film was awarded the following:
 Golden Fox award for the Best Debut Direction 2019/20 - Calcutta International Cult Film Festival, India
 Best Debut Direction 2020 - Monthly edition - Singapore World Film Carnival, Singapore
 Finalist 2019/20 - Canadian cinematography awards, Canada
 Finalist 2019/20 - Asian cinematography awards, Philippines
 Nominated 2019 - Rome Independent Prisma awards, Italy 
 Nominated 2019 - Florence Film awards, Italy
 Nominated 2020 - NICE International Film Festival 
 Best Cinematography - NICE International Film Festival

References

External links
https://ensquaredentertainment.lk/dada-ima/
https://imdb.com/title/tt11162580/

Sinhala-language films
Sri Lankan drama films